Heinrich Eduard Lauri (11 December 1890 Paasvere Parish, Virumaa – 8 February 1942 Lesnoy, Kirov Oblast) was an Estonian politician. He was a member of VI Riigikogu (its National Council).

References

1890 births
1942 deaths
Members of the Estonian National Assembly
Members of the Riiginõukogu
People from Vinni Parish
Estonian people executed by the Soviet Union
Estonian people who died in prison custody
People who died in the Gulag